The Indonesia PGA Championship was a golf tournament held in Indonesia. It was sanctioned by the Asian Tour in 1996 and 1997, the OneAsia tour from 2011 to 2014, and also co-sanctioned by the Japan Golf Tour in 2013 and 2014. The purse in 2014 was US$1,000,000.

Winners

Notes

References

External links
Official site
Coverage on the Japan Golf tour's official site

Golf tournaments in Indonesia
Asia Golf Circuit events
Former Asian Tour events
Former Japan Golf Tour events
Recurring sporting events established in 2011